Foulshiels railway station served the town of Bathgate, West Lothian, Scotland, from 1850 to 1852 on the Longridge and Bathgate Extension Railway.

History 
The station was opened in May 1850 by the Edinburgh and Glasgow Railway. It was situated to the north of a level crossing near West Foulshiels farm. It had a station building by the level crossing. It was a short-lived station, closing in 1852.

References

External links 
RailScot

Disused railway stations in West Lothian
Railway stations in Great Britain opened in 1850
Railway stations in Great Britain closed in 1852
1850 establishments in Scotland
1852 disestablishments in Scotland